Ana Sofrenović (born 18 September 1972) is a Serbian actress. She appeared in more than thirty films since 1994.

Personal life
Sofrenović was married to Dragan Mićanović and they have two daughters, Iva and Lena. The family lived in London but they continued to work in Serbia and the Balkans. They divorced in November 2011.

Partial filmography

References

External links 

1972 births
Living people
Actresses from Belgrade
Serbian film actresses
Serbian people of English descent
Serbian people of Irish descent
20th-century Serbian actresses
21st-century Serbian actresses